Macarostola gamelia is a moth of the family Gracillariidae. It is known from Java, Indonesia.

The larvae feed on Eugenia polyantha. They probably mine the leaves of their host plant.

References

Macarostola
Moths described in 1936